2012 Regional League Division 2 Bangkok Metropolitan Region is the 4th season of the League competition since its establishment in 2009. It is in the third tier of the Thai football league system.

Changes from Last Season

Team Changes

Promoted Clubs

No club was promoted to the Thai Division 1 League. Last years league champions Kasetsart University and runners up North Bangkok College failed to qualify from the 2011 Regional League Division 2 championship pool.

Relegated Clubs

RBAC Mittraphap, Samut Prakan Customs United and Thai Honda were relegated from the 2011 Thai Division 1 League.

Renamed Clubs

 RBAC Mittraphap renamed RBAC BEC Tero Sasana.
 Samut Prakan Customs United renamed Customs United whom they were known as in the 2009 league campaign.
 Prachinburi renamed Rayong United.  and move to Rayong province

Relocated Clubs

Samut Sakhon  re-located to the Regional League Bangkok Area Division from the  Regional League Central-East Region 2011.

Maptaphut Rayong, Royal Thai Fleet, Thanyaburi United have all been moved into the Central-East Region 2012

Paknampho NSRU moved into the  Division 2 League Northern Region 2012

Withdrawn Clubs

Raj-Vithi have withdrawn from the 2012 campaign.

Returning Clubs

Central Lions (previously known as (North-Central)   is returning to the league.

Expansion Clubs

Krung Thonburi, Rangsit

Stadium and Locations

League table

Results

References

External links
  Football Association of Thailand

Regional League Bangkok Area Division seasons
Bang